Pál Domonkos (10 December 1908 – 21 May 1964) was a Hungarian rower. He competed at the 1936 Summer Olympics in Berlin with the men's eight where they came fifth.

References

1908 births
1964 deaths
Hungarian male rowers
Olympic rowers of Hungary
Rowers at the 1936 Summer Olympics
Rowers from Budapest
European Rowing Championships medalists